UFV may refer to:
 University of the Fraser Valley
 Universidade Federal de Viçosa